Western and Atlantic Depot may refer to:

Western and Atlantic Depot (Dalton, Georgia)
Western and Atlantic Depot (Marietta, Georgia)
Western and Atlantic Depot (Ringgold, Georgia)